Edwin Forrest Taylor (December 29, 1883 – February 19, 1965) was an American character actor whose artistic career spanned six different decades, from silents through talkies to the advent of color films.

Early years
Taylor was born in Bloomington, Illinois. His father managed the Dreamland Theatre in Kewanee, Illinois, and a news item in 1916 reported, "Manager Chris Taylor of Dreamland at Kewanee features his son, E. Forrest Taylor, in Western pictures every Monday."

Career

Stage

Taylor was a veteran of the stage by the time he started appearing as a silent lead in both short and feature-length films. His talents extended beyond acting to include management. The Richfield Reaper, in a January 23, 1908, article, wrote about Taylor's efforts with the Empire Amusement Company, saying, "Mr. Taylor certainly deserves success as when he took hold of the company it was badly disorganized and in debt, but he has brought order out of the chaos and is now in good shape ..."

A newspaper article published in The Arizona Republic on October 13, 1922, described Taylor and Anne Berryman as "two of the best known players in the western portion of the country." At that time, Taylor headed his own troupe after having spent nine months with the Majestic Theatre Players in Los Angeles.

Taylor's Broadway credits include Open House (1947) and We, the People (1932).

Film
Taylor essayed prime roles in the films The Terror of Twin Mountains (1915), Sunset Country (1915), April (1916), True Nobility (1916) and The Abandonment (1916), before joining the army during  World War I. He would not return to films until 1926, appearing in A Poor Girl's Romance.

During the 1930s, Taylor became entrenched as a supporting player in B-westerns and several cliffhanger serials, often playing either the action or brains heavy roles. As he grew older and grayer, Taylor migrated to nice guy roles, such as the father of the heroine, a lawman, or a scientist. 

Taylor is identified in about 400 films, including 325 sound era films and of those, 201 are westerns and 36 are chapterplays, according to the Internet Movie Database. As well, his credits at Republic Pictures number about 75 for the period 1937-1953 (most all of these are B-westerns and serials).

His last film was Bitter Creek (1954).

Television
After the westerns and serials faded Taylor migrated to television work. From 1952 through 1954, he costarred as Grandpa Fisher on the religious TV series This is the Life. In 1960 Taylor appeared as the Minister on the TV western Cheyenne in the episode titled "The Long Rope."  He retired in 1963 after filming an episode of Ripcord.

Personal life
Taylor was married to actress Ada Daniels, and the two appeared together in stage productions. They had a son and a daughter.

Death 
Taylor died of natural causes on February 19, 1965, in Garden Grove, California, at the age of 81.

Filmography

Films

 The Abandonment (1916) (film debut)
 The Social Pirates (1916)
 No Man's Gold (1926)
 Reno (1930)
 The Death Kiss (1932)
 Turn Back the Clock (1933)
 One Man's Journey (1933)
 Broadway to Hollywood (1933)
 Riders of Destiny (1933)
 The Mysterious Mr. Wong (1934)
 The Gilded Lily (1935)
 Shadow of Doubt (1935)
 Mississippi (1935)
 Trail of Terror (1935)
 The Widow from Monte Carlo (1935)
 Charlie Chan at the Race Track (1936)
 Reefer Madness (1936)
 Prison Shadows (1936) as George Miller                                                                         
 Men of the Plains (1936)
 Where Trails Divide (1937)
 Riders of the Dawn (1937)
 Phantom Gold (1938)
 Heroes of the Hills (1938)
 Frontier Town (1938)
 Meet Dr. Christian (1939)
 Young Tom Edison (1940)
 The Golden Trail (1940)
 The Sagebrush Family Trails West (1940)
 Boys of the City (1940)
 That Gang of Mine (1940)
 Trailing Double Trouble (1940)
 Billy the Kid's Gun Justice (1940)
 Wild Horse Range (1940)
 The Lone Rider Rides On (1941)
 Flying Wild (1941)
 Wrangler's Roost (1941)
 The Singing Hill (1941)
 Underground Rustlers (1941)
 Reap the Wild Wind (1942)
 The Spoilers (1942)
 In Old California (1942)
 Bullets for Bandits (1942)
 Arizona Stage Coach (1942)
 Trail Riders (1942)
 Hangmen Also Die! (1943)
 Corregidor (1943)
 Air Raid Wardens (1943)
 The Kansan (1943)
 Land of Hunted Men (1943)
 Bullets and Saddles (1943)
 Lady in the Death House (1944)
 Wilson (1944)
 Sundown Valley (1944)
 Can't Help Singing (1944)
 Rockin' in the Rockies (1945)
 Bewitched (1945)
 Strange Impersonation (1946)
 Lady Luck (1946)
 Renegade Girl (1946)
 Trail Street (1947)
 The Sea of Grass (1947)
 Unconquered (1947)
 Yankee Fakir (1947)
 Albuquerque (1948)
 Return of the Bad Men (1948)
 Four Faces West (1948)
 The Golden Eye (1948)
 South of St. Louis (1949)
 Death Valley Gunfighter (1949)
 The Gal Who Took the West (1949)
 The Pecos Pistol (1949)
 Montana (1950)
 Johnny One-Eye (1950)
 Winchester '73 (1950)
 Close to My Heart (1951)
 Lone Star (1952)
 Rancho Notorious (1952)
 Ma and Pa Kettle at the Fair (1952)
 Flaming Feather (1952)
 The Story of Will Rogers (1952)
 Untamed Frontier (1952)
 Gunsmoke (1953) - Cal (uncredited)
 Iron Mountain Trail (1953) - Sam Sawyer
 The Marshal's Daughter (1953) - Uncle Jed (uncredited)
 Calamity Jane (1953) - Mcpherson - Minister (uncredited)
 The Boy from Oklahoma (1954) - Doctor (uncredited)
 Rails Into Laramie (1954) - Hank (uncredited)
 Dawn at Socorro (1954) - Jebb Hayes
 Footsteps in the Night (1957) - Shaw, Sunset Vista Manager (uncredited)
 Man of a Thousand Faces (1957) - Miracle Man (uncredited)
 The FBI Story (1959) - Wedding Minister (final film, uncredited)

Serials

 The Fighting Devil Dogs (1938)
 Dick Tracy Returns (1938)
 The Phantom Creeps (1939)
 The Lone Ranger Rides Again (1939)
 The Oregon Trail (1939)
 Terry and the Pirates (1940)
 Deadwood Dick (1940)
 The Green Archer (1940)
 The Spider Returns (1941, Serial)
 The Iron Claw (1941)
 King of the Texas Rangers (1941)
 Sea Raiders (1941)
 Dick Tracy vs. Crime Inc. (1941)
 Perils of the Royal Mounted (1942)
 Perils of Nyoka (1942)
 King of the Mounties (1942)
 The Valley of Vanishing Men (1942)
 The Desert Hawk (1944)
 Haunted Harbor (1944)
 Zorro's Black Whip (1944)
 Manhunt of Mystery Island (1945)
 The Crimson Ghost (1946)
 The Black Widow (1947)
 Superman (1948) - Leeds [Chs. 3-4]
 Tex Granger (1948)
 Bruce Gentry (1949)
 The Lost Planet (1953) - Prof. Edmund Dorn

Television appearances

 The Cisco Kid (1950-1953) - Red Bell/Sheriff/Reverend Calvin Whitacre/Rev. William Smiley/Norman Slade, Cattle Inspector/Nugget City Sheriff/John Warren, Railroad President/Replaced by Leary/ Sheriff/Hale, Durado Banker
 The Adventures of Wild Bill Hickok (1952) - Old Ira Beecher
 The Roy Rogers Show (1952-1955) - Joe Salem /Al Houston/Beaver Gramps Jones aka Gramps/Ned Virges/Sheriff/Doc Seavers
 Annie Oakley (1954) - Ed Willis/Dr. Thomas Moody
 Lassie (1955-1961) - Dr. Spencer/Judge Amos Porter
 Four Star Playhouse (1955) - Dr. Washburn
 Medic (1955) - Dr. Marvin
 Waterfront (1955) - Si Walker 
 My Friend Flicka (1956) - Saginaw/Judge Spencer
 Official Detective (1957) - Hunter
 The Life and Legend of Wyatt Earp (1956-1957) - Todd/Col. Fentress
 Doc Martin (1957) - Doc Martin 
 The Lineup (1958) - Jake Duncan
 Dick Powell's Zane Grey Theater (1958) - Dr. Caslin
 The Restless Gun (1958) - Doc 
 Father Knows Best (1959) - Painter 
 The Dennis O'Keefe Show (1959) - Julius Valentine
 Man Without a Gun (1959) - Doc Brannon
 Overland Trail (1960) - Doctor 
 Tales of Wells Fargo (1959-1960) - Pop Kyle/Mr. Monroe
 Cheyenne (1960-1961) - Minister/Doctor
 Maverick (1960) - Proprietor
 Wanted: Dead or Alive (1960) - Dr. Russell (uncredited)
 M Squad (1960) - Pop Larsen (uncredited)
 Lawman (1960) - Sheriff Dawson
 Bonanza (1960–1962) - John/Rancher
 The Law and Mr. Jones (1962) - Foreman 
 Ripcord (1963) - Martin Seims

References

External links

American male silent film actors
American male stage actors
American male television actors
People from Bloomington, Illinois
1883 births
1965 deaths
United States Army personnel of World War I
United States Army soldiers
20th-century American male actors
Male film serial actors